The gar is a North American freshwater fish of the family Lepisosteidae, distinct from the saltwater garfish.

Gar may also refer to:

Places
 Gar, Fars, a village in Iran
 Gar, Sistan and Baluchestan, a village in Iran
 Shiquanhe, Tibet, a town also known as Gar
 Gar County, in Tibet, China

GAR
 Glycineamide ribonucleotide
 Glutathione amide reductase, an enzyme
 Grand Army of the Republic, US Civil War veterans organization
 Garrison Hall, University of Texas at Austin

People
 Gar (name), a list of people with the given name, nickname or Tibetan clan name

Other uses
 Gar (music), a Tibetan form of chanting
 Gar (spear), an Old English word meaning "spear"
 Tambor-class submarine, a US Navy class whose later members were sometimes attributed to the "Gar class"
 , a World War II submarine
 Gar mine, in Russia
 Garfield "Gar" Logan, DC Comics superhero Beast Boy
 Galeya language of Papua New Guinea, ISO 639-3 code

See also
 Garr (disambiguation)
 Garre (disambiguation)
 Gars (disambiguation)